is a Japanese video game director, game designer, HAL Laboratory employee, and painter who is the current general director of the Kirby series and voice of King Dedede.

Biography

Early life
Born in the Gifu Prefecture in 1979, Kumazaki studied at the Kanazawa College of Art and the Suidobata Fine Arts Academy.

Early work at HAL Laboratory
Kumazaki first joined HAL Laboratory in 2002, where some of his early roles included debugging the game Kirby: Nightmare in Dream Land and designer for Kirby Air Ride (for the levels) and Kirby Canvas Curse (for the battle with the final boss Drawcia). His first game as director came in 2008 as the Nintendo DS remake Kirby Super Star Ultra where the original game was further expanded to include four additional sub-games.

As director
In 2010, he was working on the built-in software for the then-new Nintendo 3DS system when he was roped in to the development team the then unfinished Kirby Wii game; under his supervision the development team eventually managed to incorporate elements from the three unfinished concepts for the project and the game was finally released as Kirby's Return to Dream Land.

Since then, Kumazaki has helmed the role of Director and later, General Director for various main Kirby platformers, including Kirby's Dream Collection 20th anniversary compilation (2012), Kirby: Triple Deluxe (2014), Kirby: Planet Robobot (2016) and Kirby Star Allies (2018). In addition, he has worked on the drafts of the box comics of the BoxBoy! series games since 2016 and is the voice actor of King Dedede of the Kirby series, a callback to Masahiro Sakurai’s role as voice actor of King Dedede in Kirby 64: The Crystal Shards.

As general director of the Kirby series games, Kumazaki considers "devices, maps, and tough boss battles" the essential components of quality action games. Kumazaki is also well known within the Kirby fandom for incorporating lore (the most notable being the Ancients first mentioned in Kirby's Return to Dream Land by Magolor) and backstories of various characters and unifying the canon of the series through the pause screen descriptions of various bosses and interviews.

As of 2021, Kumazaki is also in the Board of Directors of HAL Laboratory.

Personal life
Kumazaki used to own a pet cat by the name of Tom; he sampled the voice of Tom for the voice of the final boss of Kirby: Planet Robobot (2016). The cat died in 2017, aged 17.

Kumazaki also maintains his own personal blog and a public Instagram profile. In his free time Kumazaki creates digital paintings of cosmic horror art, commonly depicting original subjects with occasional renditions of Kirby bosses.

Works

See also
Masahiro Sakurai - the creator of the Kirby series
Kirby series

References

External links

1979 births
Living people
Horror artists
Japanese lyricists
Japanese male voice actors
Japanese portrait painters
Japanese video game directors
Kirby (series)
Nintendo people
People from Gifu Prefecture